Nishimuraya Yohachi (dates unknown) was one of the leading publishers of woodblock prints in late 18th Japan. He founded the Nishimuraya Yohachi publishing house, also known as Nishiyo (西与), which operated in Nihonbashi's Bakurochō Nichōme under the shop name Eijudō.

According to Andreas Marks, Nishimuraya is "one of the most important publishers in the history of prints and may be the publisher with the biggest output over time," attributing his success to "engaging the best artists and providing a broad range of prints to satisfy the public's interest." Nishimuraya Yohachi also published prints by Eishi, Kuniyasu, Toyokuni I and Kunisada.

Nishimuraya is immortalized in the 1787 print Eijudō Hibino at Seventy-one by Utagawa Toyokuni I.

He is known to have been a member of the Fuji-kō, an Edo period cult centred around Mount Fuji. Founded by an ascetic named Hasegawa Kakugyō (1541–1646), the cult venerated the mountain as a female deity, and encouraged its members to climb it. In doing so they would be reborn, "purified and... able to find happiness." The cult waned in the Meiji period and although it persists to this day it has been subsumed into Shintō sects. The publisher's association with the Fuji-kō gives clues not only to imagery in his portrait by Utagawa, but also to his eagerness to participate in the production of Hokusai's various works celebrating Mount Fuji.

References

Sources
 
 Machotka, Ewa. Visual Genesis of Japanese National Identity: Hokusai's Hyakunin Isshu. Brussels: Peter Lang, 2009.
 Marks, Andreas. Japanese Woodblock Prints: Artists, Publishers and Masterworks 1680-1900. Tokyo: Tuttle, 2010.
 Melton, J. Gordon. Encyclopedia of Religious Phenomena. Canton, MI: Visible Ink Press, 2008
 Newland, Amy Reigle. Ed. Hotei Encyclopedia of Woodblock Prints, vol. 2., 2003.
 Volker, T. Ukiyoe Quartet: publisher, designer, engraver and printer. Mededelingen van het Rijksmuseum voor Volkenkunde,  Issue 5, Volume 129. Leiden: E. J. Brill, 1949.
 Japanese Prints. Nishimuraya Yohachi. Cowell-Thackray Collection of Japanese woodblock prints and works on paper. Accessed October 27, 2013. 
 Honolulu Museum of Art. Portrait of Publisher Nishimuraya Yohachi I on His Seventy-first Birthday. Accessed October 28, 2013.

See also
Ukiyo-e
Edo period



Japanese publishers (people)
Ukiyo-e